Victor L. Williams (born September 19, 1970) is an American actor best known as Doug Heffernan's (Kevin James) best friend Deacon Palmer on The King of Queens. He has also appeared on several other hit TV shows, including Homicide: Life on the Street, Law & Order, ER, New York Undercover, Girlfriends, Fringe and The Jamie Foxx Show. In 2012, Williams was seen and heard as a pitchman for Verizon Fios television commercials.

Early life
Williams was born in Brooklyn, New York. He attended Midwood High School, where he used his 6 ft 5  in (197 cm) height by playing power forward on the school basketball team. He went on to attend college at Binghamton University in Upstate New York. Then he received a Masters of Fine Arts degree in acting from New York University's Graduate Acting Program at the Tisch School of the Arts.

Filmography

Film

Television

References

External links

1970 births
Living people
Male actors from New York City
African-American male actors
American male film actors
American male television actors
Binghamton University alumni
People from Brooklyn
Tisch School of the Arts alumni
20th-century American male actors
21st-century American male actors
Midwood High School alumni
American male voice actors